Stilus is a genus of diatoms in the family Plagiotropidaceae.

References

Diatom genera
Naviculales